The women's marathon athletics events for the 2016 Summer Paralympics took place in the streets of Rio de Janeiro on the 18 September. A total of two events were contested over this distance for three different disability classifications.

Results

T12
The T12 women's marathon was open to both T12 and T11 competitors, which are classifications for visually impaired athletes.

T54
The T54 women's marathon was open to both T54 and T53 competitors.

References

Athletics at the 2016 Summer Paralympics
Summer Paralympics
Marathons at the Paralympics
2016 Summer Paralympics
Women in Rio de Janeiro (city)